Mixx was a user-driven social media website that served to help users submit or find content by peers based on interest and location. It combined social networking and bookmarking with web syndication, blogging and personalization tools. In December 2011, the service was sold to Chime.in where the service was eventually shut down.

Details
Mixx enabled customer to control a personalized blend of web content that includes text-based articles, images and videos. Users could search and discover media relevant to their interests, and interact with other Mixx users.

Mixx partnered with online publishing outlets including CNN.com, USA Today, Reuters, The Los Angeles Times and The Weather Channel.

Functionality
Mixx allows users to create their own personalized start page and create their own unique blend of web-based media. Mixx users can influence the flow of incoming media and recommend relevant media to other users within specific categories such as business, sports, and health by submitting, commenting on, and voting for or against stories, photos, and videos that they like or dislike using a democratic voting method.

History
Mixx was founded in 2007 by Chris McGill.  The holding company was Recommended Reading, Inc. of McLean, Virginia.
In June 2007, Mixx received initial funding from Intersouth Partners of Durham, North Carolina. As of December 6, 2011, Mixx domain redirects to Chime.in. At that time Chime.in provided a similar experience as Mixx.com once did. As of July 30, 2014, Chime.in has since ceased services. Chime.in now recommends the developer's Twitter client applications.

References and notes

External links
archived website

American social networking websites